Santiurde may refer to two municipalities in Cantabria, Spain:

 Santiurde de Reinosa
 Santiurde de Toranzo